The Wetʼsuwetʼen are a First Nation who live on the Bulkley River and around Burns Lake, Broman Lake, and François Lake in the northwestern Central Interior of British Columbia. The endonym Wetʼsuwetʼen means "People of the Wa Dzun Kwuh River (Bulkley River)".

The Wetʼsuwetʼen are a branch of the Dakelh or Carrier people, and in combination with the Babine people have been referred to as the Western Carrier. They speak Witsuwitʼen, a dialect of the Babine-Witsuwitʼen language which, like its sister language Carrier, is a member of the Athabaskan family.

Their oral history, called kungax, recounts that their ancestral village, Dizkle or Dzilke, once stood upstream from the Bulkley Canyon. This cluster of cedar houses on both sides of the river is said to have been abandoned because of an omen of impending disaster. The exact location of the village has been lost. The neighbouring Gitxsan people of the Hazelton area have a similar tale, though the village in their version is named Dimlahamid (Temlahan).

Clans 
In the traditional Wetʼsuwetʼen governance system, there are five clans, which are further subdivided into thirteen house groups. Each house group is led by a single house chief, and also includes several sub chiefs (also referred to as "wing chiefs"). Hereditary chief names (both house chiefs and sub chiefs) are usually passed on to a successor chosen by the incumbent name holder, more often than not through family lines. Clan membership is transmitted matrilineally, from mother to children. In Witsuwit'en, male hereditary chiefs are referred to as dinï zeʼ, and female hereditary chiefs are referred to as tsʼakë zeʼ.

The house groups and house chiefs of each of the five clans, as well as the English names of the current house chiefs, can be found in the chart below.

*Unist'ot'en Camp Group is affiliated with the Yex T'sa Wilk'us (Dark House) under the Gilseyhu (Big Frog) Clan

Wetʼsuwetʼen First Nation Bands

History 
In 1960, the Decker Lake, François Lake (later Nee-Tahi-Buhn), Maxim Lake and Skin Tyee Bands merged to form the Omineca Band. In 1984, the Omineca Band divided into the Nee-Tahi-Buhn and Browman (or Broman) Lake Bands, the latter of which later became Wetʼsuwetʼen First Nation. In 2000, the Skin Tyee Band separated from the Nee-Tahi-Buhn Band.

Contemporary First Nation Bands 
The following two First Nations are members of the Carrier-Sekani Tribal Council:

Wetʼsuwetʼen First Nation - also known as Browman (or Broman) Lake, formerly as Browman Indian Lake Band, located outside of Burns Lake, British Columbia.
Ts'il Kaz Koh First Nation - also known as Burns Lake, located around Burns Lake, British Columbia.

The following four First Nations are not affiliated with any tribal council:

Hagwilget Village First Nation - located in the village of Hagwilget (meaning "place of the gentle or quiet people" in Gitxsan), also known as Tse-kya ("base of rock"), on the east side of the Bulkley Canyon, near Hazelton, British Columbia, about 325 kilometres inland from the coast.
Nee-Tahi-Buhn Band - formerly called François Lake Tribe. Nee-Tahi-Buhn is the Babine-Witsuwitʼen name for François Lake, and means "it fills at one end and empties at the other".
Skin Tyee First Nation - also known as the Skin Tyee Indian Band, also spelled "Skin Tayi", located near François Lake, in the Omineca Country to the west of the City of Prince George, British Columbia.
Witset First Nation - also known as Moricetown Band, located in Witset, British Columbia.

Office of the Wetʼsuwetʼen 
The Office of the Hereditary Chiefs of the Wetʼsuwetʼen, also known as the Office of the Wetʼsuwetʼen or the OW, is a political organization governed by the hereditary chiefs of the Wetʼsuwetʼen people, based in Smithers, British Columbia. The Office takes part in the BC Treaty Process through the two Indian Act band governments (Hagwilget and Witset First Nations) which contain the 13 hereditary chieftaincies. The Office is not a tribal council, nor a traditional governing body, but rather a non-profit society, directed by a Board of Directors, with the goal of being a central office of the Wetʼsuwetʼen Nation. It was founded as an independent office in 1994, after the splitting of the Gitxsan-Wet’suwet’en Tribal Council, which had represented the two nations during Delgamuukw v British Columbia.

As of April 2020, the Board of Directors was composed of seven house chiefs (Naʼmoks, Knedebeas, Madeek, Samooh, Kloum Khun, Wah Tah Kʼeght, and Hagwilnegh).

As of 2009, the organization was at Stage 4 of the BC Treaty Process.

On May 14, 2020, the governments of Canada and British Columbia signed a Memorandum of Understanding (MOU) with the hereditary chiefs of the Wet’suwet’en, in which the Canadian and B.C. governments "recognize that Wet’suwet’en rights and title are held by Wet’suwet’en houses under their system of governance". Following concerns by leaders of the band councils, the hereditary chiefs clarified that the Office of the Wetʼsuwetʼen is not a governing body, and that the authority of the band councils under the MOU would not be diminished.

See also 
 Delgamuukw v British Columbia
2020 Canadian pipeline and railway protests

Notes

References

Citations

Sources

External links 
 The office of the Wetʼsuwetʼen